Andrus  may refer to:

Places
Andrus Island, island in the Sacramento-San Joaquin River Delta, California, United States
Mount Andrus, shield volcano in Antarctica

Given name

Surname
Bart Andrus (born 1958), American football coach
Bill Andrus (1907–1982), American baseball player
Burton C. Andrus (1892–1977), American soldier
Cecil D. Andrus (1931–2017), American politician
Chuck Andrus (1928–1997), American jazz double-bassist
Clift Andrus (1890–1968), American general
Elvis Andrus (born 1988), Venezuelan baseball player
Ethel Percy Andrus (1884–1967), American educator and founder of the AARP
Evelyn Andrus (1909–1972), Canadian photographer
Fred Andrus (1850–1937), American baseball player
Henry Andrus (1844–1935), American politician
Jerry Andrus (1918–2007), American magician
John Emory Andrus (1841–1934), American politician
Lou Andrus (born 1943), American football player
Marc Handley Andrus (born 1956), American bishop
Mark Andrus, American screenwriter
Milo Andrus (1814–1893), American leader in The Church of Jesus Christ of Latter-day Saints
Sedley Andrus (1915–2009), British officer of arms
Shane Andrus (born 1980), American football placekicker
Sherman Andrus, American gospel singer
Wesley P. Andrus (1834–1898), American politician
William Andrus (1806–1884), American politician
William W. Andrus (1821–1910), American politician
Wiman Andrus (1858–1935), Canadian baseball player

See also
Andreus (sometimes written "Andrus"), a figure from Greek mythology